Josefina Echánove (born Josefina Rojas Hudson; 21 July 1917 – 11 July 1999) was a Mexican film, television and stage actress. She received two Ariel Award nominations for her acting roles.

Early life
Echánove was born in New York and raised in Guanajuato, Mexico. She studied journalism at Universidad Femenina de México in Mexico City and later changed her major to dance. She went on to found the Contemporary Dance Academy of the University of Guanajuato.

Acting career
Her acting career began with roles in the Entremeses Cervantinos, which later became the International Cervantino Festival. She went on to appear in more than 40 films (both Mexican and American), and more than 40 television soap operas. She was twice nominated for Best Actress in a Picture at the Ariel Awards: in 1991 for Por tu maldito amor, by Rafael Villaseñor Kuri and in 1993 for Serpientes y Escaleras (Serpents and Stairs), by Busi Cortés.

One of her most notable stage performances was in 1985, when she appeared in the play La fiera del Ajusco by Mexican playwright Víctor Hugo Rascón Banda.

Selected films
El hombre de los hongos (1976)
The Children of Sanchez (1978)
Border Cop (1979)
Missed (1982)
The Honorary Consul (1983)
Amityville 3-D (1983) as Dolores
Old Gringo (1989)
Cabeza de Vaca (1991)
Perdita Durango (1997)
The Other Conquest (1998)
Santitos (1999)
Todos hemos pecado (2008)

Selected television series 
Cuna de Lobos (1986) as Elvia
La Dueña (Mexico) (1995) as Martina
Cañaveral de Pasiones (1996) as Remedios
Rubí (2004) as Pancha Muñoz
Mañana es para siempre (2008) as Rosenda
Corazón salvaje (2010) as Kuma

Personal life 
She married lawyer Alonso Echánove, and together they had two daughters and one son.  Their oldest son, Alonso Echánove, is an actor.  Their daughters are journalist Peggy Echánove and pop singer Marisol de las Mercedes Echánove, professionally known as María del Sol.

References

External links

1928 births
2020 deaths
Actresses from Guanajuato
Mexican film actresses
Mexican telenovela actresses
Mexican stage actresses
Actresses from New York (state)
20th-century Mexican actresses
21st-century Mexican actresses
21st-century American women